Onnuria is a genus of moths in the family Lecithoceridae.

Species
 Onnuria arfakana Park, 2011
 Onnuria depaprensis Park, 2011
 Onnuria melanotoma Park, 2011
 Onnuria tenuiella Park, 2011
 Onnuria xanthochroa Park, 2011

References

 
Lecithocerinae
Moth genera